The women's speed competition in sport climbing at the 2009 World Games took place on 18 July 2009 at the Shoushan Junior High School in Kaohsiung, Taiwan.

Competition format
A total of 12 athletes entered the competition. In qualification every athlete has 2 runs, best time counts. Top 8 climbers qualify to main competition.

Results

Qualifications

Competition bracket

References 

 
2009 World Games